Carol Young is a Paralympic swimmer from Australia. She was a classified "A2" competitor at the 1984 New York/Stoke Mandeville Paralympics representing Australia in backstroke, freestyle, individual medley, butterfly and breaststroke events. She won a silver medal in the 100 m breaststroke A2 event and a bronze medal in the 100 m butterfly A2 event.

References

Female Paralympic swimmers of Australia
Swimmers at the 1984 Summer Paralympics
Paralympic silver medalists for Australia
Paralympic bronze medalists for Australia
Living people
Medalists at the 1984 Summer Paralympics
Year of birth missing (living people)
Paralympic medalists in swimming
Australian female freestyle swimmers
Australian female backstroke swimmers
Australian female breaststroke swimmers
Australian female butterfly swimmers
Australian female medley swimmers
20th-century Australian women